100 Greengate (known as Anaconda Cut) (during development known as Exchange Court) is a residential skyscraper in Salford, Greater Manchester, United Kingdom with a height of . As of 2023, it is the second-tallest building in Salford after Cortland at Colliers Yard and the eighth-tallest building in Greater Manchester.

It was designed by OMI Architects and is part of a major redevelopment of the Greengate area. The 44 storey tower includes a lower elevation clad with aluminium panels reaching 16 storeys. The main tower is covered with reflective metal panels set behind the glass.

The site is bounded by Trinity Way to the north, and Greengate to the south.

History 
Construction of the building started in May 2016 and it was topped out in March 2018.

Gallery

See also
List of tallest buildings and structures in Salford
List of tallest buildings and structures in Greater Manchester

References

Buildings and structures completed in 2018
Buildings and structures in Salford